El Ruido y la Furia (Spanish for The Sound and the Fury, after William Faulkner's homonymous novel) is a live album by the Latin rock group Héroes del Silencio, recorded on 20–21 November 1995 at the Sala La Riviera in Madrid. Released in 2005, it peaked at the top of the Spanish album charts.

A DVD is included with the album.

Track listing

"Iberia Sumergida" - 5:16
"¡Rueda, Fortuna!" - 3:58
"Sirena Varada" - 4:41
"Parasiempre" - 3:59
"Maldito Duende" - 5:44
"Oración" - 4:23
"Nuestros Nombres" - 8:00
"Entre Dos Tierras" - 5:58
"Avalancha" - 6:24
"Mar Adentro" - 4:04
"Decadencia" - 2:16

Charts

References

Héroes del Silencio albums
Rock en Español albums
2005 live albums
EMI Records live albums
Spanish-language live albums
EMI Records video albums
2005 video albums
Live video albums